The 1975 U.S. Women's Open was the 30th U.S. Women's Open, held July 17–20 at Atlantic City Country Club in Northfield, New Jersey, west of Atlantic City.

This champion was Sandra Palmer at 295 (+7), four strokes ahead of the three runners-up, JoAnne Carner, Sandra Post, and amateur  Age 18 and a recent high school graduate, Lopez co-led after 36 holes

Past champions in the field

Made the cut

Source:

Missed the cut

Source:

Final leaderboard
Sunday, July 21, 1974

Source:

References

External links
Golf Observer final leaderboard
U.S. Women's Open Golf Championship
Atlantic City Country Club

U.S. Women's Open
Golf in New Jersey
Sports competitions in New Jersey
U.S. Women's Open
U.S. Women's Open
U.S. Women's Open
Women's sports in New Jersey